Nationality words link to articles with information on the nation's poetry or literature (for instance, Irish or France).

Events
 February 28 – Lord Byron writes a letter to Thomas Moore and includes in it his poem, "So, we'll go no more a roving". Moore will publish the poem in 1830 as part of Letters and Journals of Lord Byron.
 March – Percy and Mary Shelley with Claire Clairmont and the latter's new daughter by Byron, Allegra (at this time called Alba), having moved from Bath, begin a year's residence in Marlow, Buckinghamshire, England, where Mary completes Frankenstein and gives birth to her third child, and Percy writes The Revolt of Islam.
 September 19 – The body of Scottish poet Robert Burns (died 1796) is moved to a new mausoleum in Dumfries.
 December 28 – English painter Benjamin Haydon introduces John Keats to William Wordsworth and Charles Lamb at a dinner in London to celebrate progress on his painting Christ's Entry into Jerusalem (in which all feature).

Works published

United Kingdom
 Lord Byron
 The Lament of Tasso
 Manfred: A dramatic poem, mostly written in 1816
 S. T. Coleridge:
 Sibylline Leaves, including a later version of "Frost at Midnight"
Zapolya: A Christmas tale
 William Combe, The Dance of Life
 George Croly, Paris in 1815
 John Hookham Frere, Prospectus and Specimen of an Intended National Work by William and Robert Whistlecraft Relating to King Arthur and his Round Table [cantos i, ii]; cantos iii and iv published 1818
 Felicia Dorothea Hemans, Modern Greece
 John Keats, Poems, including Endymion
 Thomas Moore, Lalla Rookh: An oriental romance
 Charlotte Caroline Richardson
Waterloo, a Poem on the Late Victory
Isaac and Rebecca
 Walter Scott, Harold the Dauntless
 Percy Bysshe Shelley:
 Laon and Cythna, revised as The Revolt of Islam; originally published on December 1, but suppressed; at the insistence of the publisher, Ollier, passages were removed and Shelley published the retitled, revised version (but misdated 1818)
 Hymn to Intellectual Beauty, written in 1816, published in Leigh Hunt's Examiner on January 19 of this year
 "Mont Blanc", published in History of a Six Weeks' Tour through a part of France, Switzerland, Germany, and Holland, a book written with his wife, Mary, who wrote most of the prose (Percy Shelley wrote the poem)
 Robert Southey, Wat Tyler: A Dramatic Poem
 Charles Wolfe, The Burial of Sir John Moore at Corunna

United States
 William Cullen Bryant, "Thanatopsis" published in the North American Review as fragments that the editors combined under the title, the first American poem to gain attention and respect from British critics; a reflection on death; influenced by reading Thomas Gray, Henry Kirke White and Robert Southey; the author was not yet 20, and many were skeptical that a young man could write the sophisticated and powerful piece
 John Neal, poetry published in The Portico volumes 3 and 4
 Robert Charles Sands, The bridal of Vaumond; A Metrical Romance, New York: James Eastburn and Co.
 The Village Songster: Containing a Selection of the Most Approved Patriotic and Comic Songs, including "He's Not Worth the Trouble" by Susanna Haswell Rowson, Haverhill, Massachusetts: "Printed by Burrill and Tileston, and sold at their bookstore", anthology

Births
Death years link to the corresponding "[year] in poetry" article:
 February 4 – John McPherson (died 1845), Canadian poet
 February 21 – José Zorrilla (died 1893), Spanish Romantic poet and dramatist
 July 4 – Elizabeth Ayton Godwin (died 1889), British Victorian era hymnwriter and religious poet
 July 12 – Henry David Thoreau (died 1862), American Transcendentalist philosopher and writer
 September 14 – Theodor Storm (died 1888, German literary realist writer
 October 28 – Cornelius Mathews (died 1889), American writer in the Young America movement
 December 15 – Raffaello Carboni (died 1875), Italian revolutionary and writer, working for a time in Australia
 Also:
 Venmani Acchen Nambudiri (died 1891), Indian, Malayalam-language poet associated with the Venmani School of poetry

Deaths
Birth years link to the corresponding "[year] in poetry" article:
 May 24 – Juan Meléndez Valdés (born 1754), Spanish
 October 26 – Moritz August von Thümmel (born 1738), German
 Tarikonda Venkamamba (born 1730), Telugu (a woman)

See also

 Poetry
 List of years in poetry
 List of years in literature
 19th century in literature
 19th century in poetry
 Romantic poetry
 Golden Age of Russian Poetry (1800–1850)
 Weimar Classicism period in Germany, commonly considered to have begun in 1788  and to have ended either in 1805, with the death of Friedrich Schiller, or 1832, with the death of Goethe
 List of poets

Notes

Poetry
19th-century poetry